Judge Kane may refer to:

John K. Kane (1795–1858), judge of the United States District Court for the Eastern District of Pennsylvania
John L. Kane Jr. (born 1937), judge of the United States District Court for the District of Colorado
Yvette Kane (born 1953), judge of the United States District Court for the Middle District of Pennsylvania

See also
Michael Stephen Kanne (1938–2022), judge of the United States Court of Appeals for the Seventh Circuit